XHEMAX-FM is a radio station on 105.3 FM in Tecomán, Colima. The station is owned by Grupo Radio Levy and operated by Grupo Audiorama Comunicaciones as MAX 105.3.

History

XHEMAX began as XELS-AM 1360, with a concession awarded on August 9, 1974 to David Flores Padilla. In the 1990s, the station changed ownership, calls and frequency to 810.

In 2011, XEMAX migrated to FM on 106.1 MHz. As part of its 2017 concession renewal, XHEMAX-FM moved again on March 10, 2018, this time to 105.3 MHz, in order to clear 106-108 MHz as much as possible for community and indigenous radio stations.

On June 21, 2019, RadioLevy announced that Grupo Radiorama would take over operation of its three radio stations on July 1, 2019. XHEMAX retained its name as "Max 105.3".

References

Radio stations in Colima